The 16th Academy Awards were held on March 2, 1944, to honor the films of 1943. This was the first Oscar ceremony held at a large public venue, Grauman's Chinese Theatre. The ceremony was broadcast locally on KFWB, and internationally by CBS Radio via shortwave. Jack Benny hosted the event, which lasted one hour and 42 minutes.

For the first time, winners for Best Supporting Actor and Best Supporting Actress were awarded full-size statuettes, instead of smaller-sized awards mounted on a plaque. This was the last year until 2009 to have 10 nominations for Best Picture; The Ox-Bow Incident is, the last film to be nominated solely in that category.

For Whom the Bell Tolls was the third film to receive nominations in all four acting categories. This was the first year in which each acting category had at least one nominee from a color film.

The Tom and Jerry cartoon series won its first Oscar this year for The Yankee Doodle Mouse; it would go on to win another six Oscars, including three in a row over the next three years, from a total of 13 nominations.

Awards

Nominees were announced on February 6, 1944. Winners are listed first and highlighted in boldface.

Academy Honorary Award
 George Pal "for the development of novel methods and techniques in the production of short subjects known as Puppetoons".

Irving G. Thalberg Memorial Award
 Hal B. Wallis

Presenters
 Donald Crisp (Presenter: Best Supporting Actor)
 Howard Estabrook (Presenter: Documentary Awards)
 Sidney Franklin (Presenter: Outstanding Motion Picture)
 Y. Frank Freeman (Presenter: Best Film Editing, Best Sound Recording, Best Special Effects and the Scientific & Technical Awards)
 Greer Garson (Presenter: Best Actress)
 James Hilton (Presenter: Writing Awards)
 Carole Landis (Presenter: Best Art Direction)
 George Murphy (Presenter: Best Actor)
 Rosalind Russell (Presenter: Best Cinematography)
 Mark Sandrich (Presenter: Best Director)
 Dinah Shore (Presenter: Music Awards)
 Walter Wanger (Presenter: Short Subject Awards and the Honorary Award)
 Teresa Wright (Presenter: Best Supporting Actress)
 Darryl F. Zanuck (Presenter: Irving G. Thalberg Memorial Award)

Performers
 Edgar Bergen & Charlie McCarthy
 Ray Bolger
 Susanna Foster
 Mitzi Gerber
 Lena Horne
 Betty Hutton
 Kay Kyser & His Band
 Red Skelton

Multiple nominations and awards

The following 26 films received multiple nominations:

 12 nominations: The Song of Bernadette
 9 nominations: For Whom the Bell Tolls
 8 nominations: Casablanca
 7 nominations: Madame Curie
 6 nominations: The More the Merrier and The North Star
 5 nominations: The Human Comedy
 4 nominations: Air Force, Phantom of the Opera, So Proudly We Hail!, and Watch on the Rhine
 3 nominations: Five Graves to Cairo, Heaven Can Wait, Sahara, Saludos Amigos, This Is the Army, and Thousands Cheer
 2 nominations: Hangmen Also Die!;  Hello, Frisco, Hello; Hit Parade of 1943; In Old Oklahoma; In Which We Serve; The Sky's the Limit; Something to Shout About; Stage Door Canteen; and Star Spangled Rhythm

The following three films received multiple awards:

 4 wins: The Song of Bernadette
 3 wins: Casablanca
 2 wins: Phantom of the Opera

See also
 1st Golden Globe Awards
 1943 in film

References

Academy Awards ceremonies
1943 film awards
1944 in Los Angeles
1944 in American cinema
CBS Radio programs
March 1944 events